Gene Patrick "Corky" Corcoran (July 28, 1924 – October 3, 1979) was an American jazz tenor saxophonist.

Early life 
Corcoran was born in Tacoma, Washington. Considered a child prodigy, he began performing in bands at the age of 16.

Career 
Corcoran first played professionally in 1940 with Sonny Dunham, then joined Harry James's ensemble for from 1941 to 1947. He left James for a short time, playing with his own ensemble and working briefly in Tommy Dorsey's band before rejoining James in 1949. He continued to work with James until 1957, and also played concurrently with his own ensembles. In 1962, he once again began working with James, an association that would continue almost to Corcoran's death.

Personal life 
Corcoran died in Tacoma.

References
Footnotes

General references
Warren Vache Sr., "Corky Corcoran". The New Grove Dictionary of Jazz, 2nd edition, ed. Barry Kernfeld.

1924 births
1979 deaths
American jazz saxophonists
American male saxophonists
Musicians from Washington (state)
20th-century American saxophonists
20th-century American male musicians
American male jazz musicians